Rhythm Round-Up is a 1945 American Western musical film directed by Vernon Keays and written by Charles R. Marion. The film stars Ken Curtis, Cheryl Walker, Guinn "Big Boy" Williams, Raymond Hatton and Victor Potel. The film was released on September 7, 1945, by Columbia Pictures.

Plot

Cast          
Ken Curtis as Jimmy Benson
Cheryl Walker as Mary Parker
Guinn "Big Boy" Williams as Zeke Winslow
Raymond Hatton as Noah Jones
Victor Potel as Slim Jensen
Eddie Bruce as J. Appleton Lockwood
Arthur Loft as Oscar Berton
Walter Baldwin as Jed Morton
Vera Lewis as Mrs. Squimp
Bob Wills as Bob Wills
Ken Trietsch as Ken 
Paul Trietsch as Hezzie 
Charles Ward as Gabe 
Gil Taylor as Gil 
Hal Hopper as Member of The Pied Pipers 
Jo Stafford as Member of The Pied Pipers 
Alan Storr as Member of The Pied Pipers 
Clark Yocum as Member of The Pied Pipers

References

External links
 

1945 films
American Western (genre) musical films
1940s Western (genre) musical films
Columbia Pictures films
American black-and-white films
Films directed by Vernon Keays
1940s English-language films
1940s American films